Ravshan Khaydarov (born 15 July 1961) is a football manager and former player. He is currently head coach of Uzbekistan U-20.

Playing career
Khaydarov started his professional career at FK Khiva in 1984, in club he spent two seasons. Next two years he played at Tselinnik. His last station as player was Traktor Tashkent.

Managing career
He started his managing career at Traktor Tashkent first as assistant coach, later he became main coach of the club.

Before he was appointed as head coach of Uzbekistan on 3 January 2002, Khaydarov was assistant coach to Uzbekistan national team coach Vladimir Salkov.

In 2002 after first season half Khaydarov was acting head coach of Pakhtakor, replacing Tachmurad Agamuradov.

After Hans-Jürgen Gede was sacked, he became an acting head coach of national team. On 25 July 2005, Khaydarov left his temporary position of trainer and replaced by Bobby Houghton

In October 2008, Khaydarov resigned his position of Pakhtakor head coach, after his club lost Metallurg Bekabad with 1:2, widening gap between Kuruvchi. After Miodrag Radulović left the club and  moved to Russian club FC Dynamo Moscow on 4 May 2010, Ravshan Khaydarov became trainer of Pakhtakor again. On 28 September 2011, Khaydarov was sacked and Murod Ismailov  replaced him as temporary caretaker of the club.

In January 2012 Khaydarov was appointed head coach of Qizilqum Zarafshon for 2012 season. On 1 April 2013, he resigned his position as Qizilqum's head coach. The club lost all 4 starting matches of 2013 season.
On 6 May 2013 he was appointed as caretaker manager of FK Dinamo Samarqand after Kamo Gazarov was sacked.

On 24 June 2014 UFF appointed Khaydarov as new head coach of Uzbekistan U-19 to prepare team for 2014 AFC U-19 Championship in Myanmar. Khaydarov resigned his post at FK Dinamo Samarqand because of new appointment.
In 2014 AFC U-19 Championship Uzbekistan-U19 with Khaydarov  reached semi-final of tournament, losing in semi-final to Northe Korea 0-5. Team secured qualification to 2015 FIFA U-20 World Cup in New Zealand. In 2015 U-20 World Cup Uzbekistan-U20 team reached quarter-final and lost to Senegal by 0-1. U-20 team repeated its achievement of 2013 FIFA U-20 World Cup.

On 30 April 2017 Khaydarov was appointed as new head coach of Uzbekistan U-22 to prepare team for upcoming qualification matches of 2018 AFC U-23 Championship in China. Shortly before he was assigned as head coach of Pakhtakor appointed on 6 April 2017. In 2018 AFC U-23 Championship in China Uzbekistan U-23 under Khaydarov's leading became champions for the first time in team's history, beating on 27 January 2018 in final Vietnam U-23 team by 2–1. His success named him as candidate for manager of senior side, which is preparing for the 2019 AFC Asian Cup. However, in the end, Héctor Cúper was assigned instead of Ravshan.

Honours

Manager
Pakhtakor
 Uzbek League (2): 2006, 2007
 Uzbek Cup (2): 2006, 2007

Uzbekistan U-23
 AFC U-23 Championship (1): 2018

Uzbekistan U-20
 AFC U-20 Championship (1): 2023

Individual
 Uzbekistan Football Coach of the Year: 2018
 Uzbekistan Football Coach of the Year 2nd (2): 2005, 2007

References

1961 births
Living people
Soviet footballers
Uzbekistani footballers
Uzbekistani football managers
Pakhtakor Tashkent FK managers
Uzbekistan national football team managers
Sportspeople from Tashkent
Association football defenders